Kuramo Beach is a sandy beach in Lagos, Nigeria, located at the south side of Victoria Island, just east of Bar Beach and south of the Kuramo Waters lagoon. It was the location of numerous illegal shanties and cabins, some of them being used for music entertainment, bars and prostitution. In August 2012, a surge of the Atlantic Ocean hit Kuramo Beach, destroying some of these shacks and killing 16 people. The next day government authorities evacuated the area, demolished the remaining shacks and began to refill the sand.

The ocean surge is said to occur every August at the beach, though in former years there were no deaths.

Some of the popular hotels to stay are Lagos Continental Hotel and Eco hotels & Suites

References

Beaches of Lagos
Victoria Island, Lagos